Cosmosoma admota is a moth of the family Erebidae. It was described by Gottlieb August Wilhelm Herrich-Schäffer in 1854. It is found in the Brazilian states of Pernambuco, Bahia and Espírito Santo.

References

admota
Moths described in 1854